GSO Stadium or Gymnastic Club Olympia Stadium (Γ.Σ.Ο.) was a stadium in Limassol, Cyprus. In July 1892, a group of locals founded the gymnastics club "Olympia" (GSO), which is the oldest gymnastics club in Cyprus. The stadium was constructed in 1898 and opened in 1899 with the event of the 3rd Pancyprian Athletics Games. The gym then had a perimeter track about 300 meters and a capacity of 700 spectators. In 1902 horse racing competitions were held in the stadium, and in 1904 the first flower festival was organized. In 1908 the stadium held the first tennis matches. In 1910 a new 1000 spectators stand was built.
   
In 1925 the association organized the first Pan-Hellenic Athletics Games, and in 1929 the first island-wide school competition. In 1931 the Metropolitan Nicodemus Mylonas initiated the national uprising, known as 'Oktovriana'. In 1954, after a donation by the N. Lanitis family, a new entrance was erected, while additional wooden benches for 2000 spectators were added.

The stadium served as home ground to AEL, and  Aris. In 1975 these teams relocated to the then newly built Tsirion Stadium. Since 2008 the area serves as a sports park.

References

Defunct sports venues in Cyprus
Sports venues completed in 1899
Sports venues demolished in 1975
1899 establishments in Cyprus
1975 disestablishments in Cyprus
Athletics (track and field) venues in Cyprus
Football venues in Cyprus